The Nokia 6290 is a multimedia 3G smartphone made by Nokia and released in March 2007.

Features 
The Nokia 6290 is the first device running off S60 3rd edition platform updated to Feature Pack 1. While using the Symbian smartphone operating system, this handset is marketed as a simple 'phone' and was one of the few Nokia Symbian handsets from 2007 that was not part of the 'N' or 'E' series.

Specification sheet

See also 
 List of Nokia products

External links 
 Official Nokia 6290 website
 Specifications at Forum Nokia
 Nokia 6290 review at Mobile-review
 Nokia 6290 review at All About Symbian
 Nokia 6290 manuals

Nokia smartphones
Mobile phones introduced in 2007
Mobile phones with infrared transmitter